Stoked is a snowboarding video game developed by Austrian-based Bongfish GmbH for the Xbox 360 in 2009. It is the latest entry in the Stoked Rider snowboard game series and is in association with Absinthe Films. In 2009 an updated version, Stoked: Big Air Edition, was released for Xbox 360, and a Microsoft Windows version was released only for the PAL region in 2011.

It is the first game in the series to feature multiple mountains and real life sponsors, and also the first to be released on a console. It also has a real weather experience; for example, when it snows, powder builds up on the mountain. When it does not snow, rocks are exposed.

Gameplay
Stoked features an adaptive system where the game recognizes "stylish" riding versus "hucker" riding; this affects the player's score if they are known for riding in one way. The original game features five different open mountains including Almirante Nieto, Mount Fuji, Diablerets, Mount Shuksan, and Alaska. Originally the mountains are only ventured through set waypoints of a helicopter, but upon achieving a score of 50,000 points on every run of a mountain, the player will gain the helicopter license for that particular mountain, allowing them to designate their own drop points.

Reception

The game received "average" reviews according to the review aggregation website Metacritic. GameSpot noted "occasional unpredictable physics" but that Stoked was a "blast, and considering that this wealth of content is going for a bargain price, it's an easy choice for boarders looking for a virtual outlet for their shredding fantasies." IGN said that "touches like snazzy weather effects, cool challenges online and (eventually) in single-player [would] please the diehard boarders out there." It was asserted that "After Shaun White Snowboarding was released to a lukewarm critical reception late last year, it looked like fans of the genre were in line for a disappointing winter" however, although "Stoked wasn't a game that was on a whole lot of people's radars...the finished product garnered quite a bit of critical acclaim for shirking the unnecessary glitz of "extreme" sports games and focusing on the basics of snowboarding." In Japan, where the game was ported for release and published by Russel on January 28, 2010, Famitsu gave it a score of one six, two sevens, and one six for a total of 26 out of 40.

Big Air Edition
After the success of the original Stoked and the release of the game in European markets, Bongfish released an expanded version of the title called Stoked: Big Air Edition. Big Air Edition adds two new mountains, Laax and K2, to the original roster of five as well as including an upgraded frame rate and enhanced snow particles. The game also includes marked paths down the mountain and brand new racing events that will pit riders against each other, in addition to groomed terrain park area. It was also announced that brand new 2010 gear and clothing would be included from major brands. The PAL version and Microsoft Windows release also include bonus video features from Absinthe Films.

Reception

The Xbox 360 version received "average" reviews, albeit a bit more positive than the original Stoked, according to Metacritic. In Japan, where the same console version was also ported for release and published by Russel on January 13, 2011, Famitsu also gave it a score of 26 out of 40.

References

External links

2009 video games
Microsoft games
Bongfish games
Destineer games
Multiplayer and single-player video games
Snowboarding video games
Video games developed in Austria
Windows games
Xbox 360 games
Video games set in Switzerland
Video games set in Alaska
Video games set in Japan
Video games set in Chile